Blood & Memory is a fantasy novel by Fiona McIntosh. The novel was published by 2004 Voyager and is the second novel in The Quickening trilogy which began with Myrren's Gift and concluded with Bridge of Souls.

Plot introduction
After seeing his best friend murdered, his sister imprisoned and the King of Morgravia turn his attention to the woman he loves, Wyl becomes desperate to return Valentyna and prevent her marrying the king. However is ends up being trapped by an enchantment and must track down the Manwitch first.

References

2004 Australian novels
Australian fantasy novels
Novels by Fiona McIntosh
Voyager Books books